Alison Louise Spedding (born 22 January 1962) is a British anthropologist and fantasy author.

Spedding studied archaeology and anthropology and later philosophy at King's College, Cambridge, receiving her BA degree in 1982. She received a PhD from the London School of Economics in 1989. She wrote a trilogy of fantasy novels, set approximately in the time of Alexander the Great. In the novels, Alexander dies, and the female protagonist, Aleizon Ailix Ayndra, goes on to fulfil Alexander's destiny.

Bolivia

In 1989, Spedding moved to Bolivia and lectured at the Higher University of San Andrés in La Paz. While there she published the academic work Wachu Wachu. Cultivo de coca e identidad en los Yungas de la Paz (1994) and Kausachun-Coca (2004).

She is the author of three novels in Spanish: Manuel y Fortunato. Una picaresca andina (1997), El viento de la cordillera (2001), and the sci-fi, anarcho-feminist novel De cuando en cuando Saturnina (2004). She is also the author of a book of short stories, El tiempo, la distancia, otros amantes (1994) and the play Un gato en el tejar, the latter published under the pseudonym Alicia Céspedes Ballet.

In Bolivia she became an outspoken critic of the government's policy of cracking down on peasant coca farmers.

In May 1998 her La Paz flat was raided and she was arrested on drugs charges, and sentenced to ten years in prison. Academics widely considered the arrest was politically motivated and campaigned for her release. She was released in 2000 on payment of a surety.

Bibliography

A Walk in the Dark trilogy
The Road and the Hills (1986)
A Cloud over Water (1988)
The Streets of the City (1988)
Wachu Wachu. Cultivo de coca e identidad en los Yungas de la Paz (1994)
Kausachun-Coca. Economía campesina cocalera en los Yungas y el Chapare. Programa de Investigación Estratégica en Bolivia (2004)
Manuel y Fortunato; una picaresca andina publicada (1997)
El viento de la cordillera: un thriller de los 80 (2001)
De cuando en cuando Saturnina; una historia oral del futuro (2004)

References

External links

 

British fantasy writers
British anthropologists
British women anthropologists
Alumni of the London School of Economics
1962 births
Living people
British women scientists
Alumni of King's College, Cambridge
British people imprisoned abroad